A Romance in Shanghai is a modern television serial jointly produced by MediaCorp (Media Corporation of Singapore) and a China television production company.  Starring Singaporean actress Fann Wong in her first non-Singaporean production, the serial is set in modern-day Shanghai where she plays a rich girl on holiday in the romantic city to reunite with her American-based Singaporean boyfriend (played by Bernard Tan).  When she discovers he has been unfaithful to her, she seeks solace in the company of a Shanghainese divorcee (played by Chinese actor He Yan).

Cast 
 Fann Wong - Jian Ni
 He Yan - Liu Liwen
 Bernard Tan - Peter
 Shen Min - Ye Xinli
 Shao Min - Casey

External links 

Singapore Chinese dramas
Television shows set in Shanghai
1996 Chinese television series debuts